Daniel Ernest Forrest Jr. (born January 7, 1978) is an American composer, pianist, educator, and music editor.

Biography
Dan Forrest was born in Breesport, New York, and began piano lessons with his elementary school music teacher at age 8. In high school Forrest won numerous piano awards, accompanied honors choirs, and performed the Grieg Piano Concerto with the Elmira Symphony. He majored in piano at Bob Jones University, earning a B.Mus. and an M.Mus. in Piano Performance, studying advanced theory and composition with Joan Pinkston and Dwight Gustafson. After teaching piano in South Carolina for 3 years, he moved to Kansas where he earned a D.M.A. in composition from the University of Kansas, studying with wind band composer James Barnes. Forrest also studied with Alice Parker, whom he counts as a foremost influence. Forrest's compositions include choral, instrumental, orchestral, and wind band works. His music appears in the catalogs of numerous publishers, primarily Beckenhorst Press (church music) and Hinshaw Music (concert music), but also Choristers Guild. In 2018, he began self-publishing his own concert music The Music of Dan Forrest, which is distributed by Beckenhorst Press. His published works have sold millions of copies worldwide.

Forrest's choral works have received the ASCAP Morton Gould Young Composer's Award, the ACDA Raymond Brock Award, a Meet The Composer grant, the University of Kansas Cius Award, the ALCM Raabe Prize,.  Forrest's music has been performed in leading venues around the world including Carnegie Hall, the Lincoln Center, NPR's Performance Today, and on the BBC Proms. A review in The Salt Lake Tribune referred to Forrest's "superb choral writing" and gave as an example his arrangement of "The First Noel," which it said was "full of spine-tingling moments."  Forrest is one of a small number of composers whose works have been included in both Teaching Music Through Performance in Choir and Teaching Music Through Performance In Band. Perhaps Forrest's best known work is Requiem for the Living (2013), having received several hundred performances worldwide. His other major works, Jubilate Deo (2016) and LUX: The Dawn From On High (2018) have also been widely performed.

Forrest taught music theory and composition at The University of Kansas as a graduate assistant from 2004 to 2007, and at Bob Jones University from 2007 to 2012, where he served as chairman of the department of music theory and composition. He now serves as co-editor at Beckenhorst Press, regularly teaches composition lessons and masterclasses, and speaks about composing, music-making, aesthetics, music publishing, and the music business in guest-artist residencies with universities and choirs in the United States and abroad. He also serves as Artist-in-Residence at Mitchell Road Presbyterian Church (PCA), Greenville, SC.

Style 
Forrest is equally at home in both concert music and church music, and he composes for ensembles across the spectrum of choral music. His background in academia and experience with professional choirs and orchestras allows him to write complex music that requires sophisticated performers, yet he also writes music accessible for amateur choirs. He is known for his skill in writing melodic lines for all voices and instruments, which he attributes to studying with Alice Parker and James Barnes. His choral works are known for their sensitivity to the nuances, speech rhythms, and deeper meanings of their texts. Additionally, his skill as a pianist and his training and experience in instrumentation/orchestration result in accompaniments that are known for their idiomatic writing and effective, impactful, and efficient scoring.

Awards
2004 John Ness Beck Foundation, first place (with noted composer John Rutter taking second place). His winning composition was a choral setting of "The King of Love My Shepherd Is."
2005 American Choral Directors Association Raymond Brock Composition Competition. His winning piece, "Selah," was premiered at the ACDA convention in 2006. 
2006 ASCAP Morton Gould Young Composers Award for selected movements from Words From Paradise, an extended work for a cappella choir. He was presented his award at the Lincoln Center.
2009 John Ness Beck Foundation, first place. 
2009 Raabe Prize, endowed for the Association of Lutheran Church Musicians by William and Nancy Raabe, for his In Paradisum
2009 Frank Ticheli International Wind Band Composition Contest, Finalist.
Numerous other awards from composition contests, musical societies (Forrest was inducted into Delta Omicron musical society in 2015), honorary memberships, etc.

Notable performances
On February 11, 2007, Forrest's music was performed in Carnegie Hall for the first time, with the world premiere of "Arise, Shine!" His works are now performed there on a regular basis. 
On Christmas Day 2008, National Public Radio featured Forrest's "Carol of Joy" on Performance Today.
On March 24, 2013 Forrest's "Requiem for the Living" was premiered as a commissioned work by The Hickory Choral Society, in honor of the organization's 35th anniversary.
In spring 2016, Forrest's Jubilate Deo was premiered as a commissioned work by the Indianapolis Children's Choirs, in honor of founder Henry Leck's retirement.
In 2016, Forrest was commissioned by Duke University Chapel to arrange "The Church's One Foundation" for the re-opening of the Chapel after rehabilitation of its limestone ceiling and replacement of its roof.
In fall 2017, Forrest's LUX: The Dawn From On High was premiered as a commissioned work by the Greenville Chorale and Symphony, conducted by Bingham Vick, Jr.
In September 2019, Forrest's setting of "And Can It Be?" was performed on the last night of the 2019 BBC Proms series, in the Northern Ireland Proms in the Park concert.
In October 2019, Bel Canto Company, Greensboro, NC, premiered Forrest's the breath of life.
Other commissioned premieres include Himenami (in Izumi Hall, Osaka, Japan) and Non Nobis Domine (in Salzburg Cathedral, Austria, July 2018).

Works 
 Requiem for the Living (2013)
 Jubilate Deo (2016)
 The Dawn from on High (2018)
 the breath of life (premiered 2019)

Personal life 
Forrest is married and has three children. He is a Christian and views his musical work as an outgrowth of his faith.

References

External links 
Official website
Beckenhorst Press (distributor of Forrest's self-published concert music and publisher of his church music)

1978 births
Living people
American male classical composers
American classical composers
20th-century classical composers
University of Kansas alumni
People from Elmira, New York
Musicians from Greenville, South Carolina
20th-century American composers
American male pianists
21st-century American pianists
20th-century American male musicians
21st-century American male musicians